Rodionovia is a genus of mites in the family Acaridae.

Species
 Rodionovia helenae (Sevastianov & Tamam-Nasem-Marros, 1993)

References

Acaridae